Trudovye Rezervy Stadium is a sports arena in Kazan, Russia, used for association football and bandy. It is also used for recreational skating.

It was used by the Socceroos, the Australian national team, as their training base for the 2018 FIFA World Cup.

References

See also
 Trudovye Rezervy

Bandy venues in Russia
Bandy World Championships stadiums